Vostok-2 may refer to:
Vostok 2, Soviet crewed spaceflight
Vostok-2 (rocket), Soviet rocket